WFTU (1570 AM) is a college radio station owned and operated by Five Towns College and licensed to Riverhead, New York. It broadcasts a variety format featuring programming produced by current students and faculty of Five Towns College. The station is also operated by a student management staff under the guidance of the general manager, a staff professor. The studio is located on the campus in Dix Hills, New York and  transmitter is in Riverside, New York. The station also streams on the internet from its website.

History 
WFTU began as top 40 WAPC on August 8, 1963, to continue the signal of WPAC/1580 to the east. It would later become WHRF as "Wharf Radio" and then the AM side of WRCN-FM in 1974 as WRCN.

Five Towns College (2001–present) 
WFTU occasionally broadcasts live music performances from the Dix Hills Center for the Performing Arts and the other performance venues on the college campus. WFTU also has a program called "Theatre of the Air," where students re-enact the old days of radio through old radio dramas. The first of these events had so many on-line listeners, the station's server crashed.

The station briefly went silent in January 2017 and resumed operations in January 2018. Additionally, on May 16, 2018, the FCC granted Five Towns College a construction permit to establish a translator for WFTU at 104.9 FM.

References

External links 

FTU
Radio stations established in 1963
Mass media in Suffolk County, New York